Leptostylus hispidulus is a species of beetle in the family Cerambycidae. It was described by Henry Walter Bates in 1874.

References

Leptostylus
Beetles described in 1874